Edmund Ironside may refer to:

Edmund Ironside, King of England in 1016
Edmund Ironside, 1st Baron Ironside, Field Marshal Sir William Edmund Ironside, Chief of the British Imperial General Staff 1939–1940
Edmund Ironside, 2nd Baron Ironside, his son, British politician and engineer
Edmund Ironside (play), an anonymous play some attribute to William Shakespeare

See also 
Edward Ironside (disambiguation)